The Georgian military ranks are the ranks and insignia currently in use by the Defense Forces of Georgia.

In early 1990s, the Defence Forces of Georgia used a transitional system of ranks and insignia, which was based on the Soviet system, but with Georgian 7-petal stars instead of the Soviet 5-petal.

Current ranks

Commissioned officer ranks
The rank insignia of commissioned officers.

Other ranks
The rank insignia of non-commissioned officers and enlisted personnel.

Historic ranks

References

External links
 

Ranks